Michael Barbieri is an American actor. His most prominent role is in Little Men (2016). He also appears in Spider-Man: Homecoming and The Dark Tower (both 2017).

Barbieri was born in New York City and is of Italian descent. He became interested in acting after seeing his brother, John, act in a school play. He gave up baseball to take acting classes. Afterwards, he got into the Lee Strasberg Acting School and soon auditioned for Little Men. His role in the film resulted in him getting signed to WME. He soon began booking roles for major films.

Filmography

References

External links
 

21st-century American male actors
Living people
Male actors from New York City
American male film actors
2002 births